Nicholas Brooks may refer to:
Nicholas Brooks (historian) (1941–2014), English medieval historian
Nicholas Brooks (special effects artist) (born 1964), British visual effects artist
Nicholas Brooks (film director), see UK Film Council Completion Fund
Nicholas Brooks in Ontario municipal elections, 2006
Nicholas Brooks (murderer), convicted of the murder of his girlfriend, Sylvie Cachay